Charles Holzer (born June 24, 1969) is an equestrian who represents the United States Virgin Islands. He competed in the individual jumping event at the 1992 Summer Olympics.

References

External links
 

1969 births
Living people
United States Virgin Islands male equestrians
Olympic equestrians of the United States Virgin Islands
Equestrians at the 1992 Summer Olympics
Sportspeople from New York City